The Joel-Rosenthal was an English electric car manufactured from 1899 until around 1902.  Designed by Henry M Joel and London-built, the car had a separate 2 hp engine with chain drive for each rear wheel.

See also 
 List of car manufacturers of the United Kingdom

References
David Burgess Wise, The New Illustrated Encyclopedia of Automobiles

Defunct motor vehicle manufacturers of England
Electric vehicles introduced in the 20th century
Vehicle manufacture in London